Michałówka may refer to the following villages in Poland: 
Michałówka, Biała Podlaska County in Lublin Voivodeship (east Poland)
Michałówka, Chełm County in Lublin Voivodeship (east Poland)
Michałówka, Janów Lubelski County in Lublin Voivodeship (east Poland)
Michałówka, Lubartów County in Lublin Voivodeship (east Poland)
Michałówka, Parczew County in Lublin Voivodeship (east Poland)
Michałówka, Łódź Voivodeship (central Poland)
Michałówka, Lesser Poland Voivodeship (south Poland)
Michałówka, Masovian Voivodeship (east-central Poland)
Michałówka, Subcarpathian Voivodeship (south-east Poland)
Michałówka, Podlaskie Voivodeship (north-east Poland)
Michałówka, Kozienice County in Masovian Voivodeship (east-central Poland)